Sternycha panamensis is a species of beetle in the family Cerambycidae. It was described by Martins and Galileo in 1999. It is known from Panama.

References

Onciderini
Beetles described in 1999